The  was a public junior college in Arakawa, Tokyo, Japan.

History 
The Tokyo Metropolitan Junior College of Aeronautic Engineering was established in 1960. In 1972, it merged with the Tokyo Metropolitan Technical College, and closed in 1975.

Academic departments
 Aeronautical engineering

References

Japanese junior colleges
Universities and colleges in Tokyo
Educational institutions established in 1960
Educational institutions disestablished in 1975
1960 establishments in Japan
1975 disestablishments in Asia